Colorado is the fifth-richest state in the United States of America, with a per capita income of $24,049 (2000) and a personal per capita income of $34,283 (2003).

Colorado counties ranked by per capita income

Note: Data is from the 2010 United States Census Data and the 2006-2010 American Community Survey 5-Year Estimates.

See also

State of Colorado
Colorado census designated places
Colorado census statistical areas
List of counties in Colorado
List of cities and towns in Colorado
United States Census Bureau
2010 United States Census

References

Colorado
Locations
Income